The Atlantic Rowing Race is an ocean rowing race from the Canary Islands to the West Indies, a distance of approximately 2,550 nm (2,930 statute miles or 4,700 km). The race was founded in 1997 by Sir Chay Blyth with subsequent races roughly every two years since. The early races were run by Challenge Business Ltd. until the race was bought by Woodvale Events Ltd., managed by Simon Chalk, in October 2003. In May 2012, Atlantic Campaigns SL, managed by Carsten Heron Olsen bought the rights to the Atlantic Rowing Race, now called The "Talisker Whisky Atlantic Challenge" – The World's Toughest Row. Since 2015, the race has been held annually starting each December.

1997 – Port St. Charles Rowing Race 
 Departure Port: Playa San Juan, Tenerife
 Arrival Port: Port St. Charles, Barbados
 Race Start: 12 October 1997
 Teams Starting: 30 
 Teams Finishing: 24 
 Categories: Pairs
 Winning Boat: Kiwi Challenge
 Team Name: Kiwi Challenge
 Country: 
 Rowers: Rob Hamill and Phil Stubbs
 Time: 41 days, 2 hours, and 55 minutes

2001 – Ward Evans Atlantic Rowing Race 
 Departure Port: Playa San Juan, Tenerife
 Arrival Port: Port St. Charles, Barbados
 Race Start: 7 October 2001
 Teams Starting: 36 
 Teams Finishing: 33 
 Categories: Pairs
 Winning Boat: Telecom Challenge 1
 Team Name: Telecom Challenge 1
 Country: 
 Rowers: Matt Goodman and Steve Westlake
 Time: 42 days, 4 hours, and 3 minutes

2003 – Woodvale Atlantic Rowing Race

 Departure Port: San Sebastián de la Gomera
 Arrival Port: Port St. Charles, Barbados
 Race Start: 19 October 2003
 Teams Starting: 17 
 Teams Finishing: 14
 Categories: Singles, Pairs
 Winning Boat: 
 Team Name: Holiday Shoppe Challenge
 Country: 
 Rowers: James Fitzgerald and Kevin Biggar
 Time: 40 days, 4 hours, and 3 minutes

2004 – Ocean Rowing Society Atlantic Rowing Regatta 

 Departure Port: San Sebastián de la Gomera
 Arrival Port: English Harbour, Antigua
 Race Start: 20 January 2004
 Teams Starting: 13 
 Teams Finishing: 12 
 Categories: Singles, Pairs, 1x Four
 Winning Boat: 
 Team Name: Atlantic-4
 Country: 
 Rowers: David Martin, Neil Wightwick, Glynn Coupland, and George Simpson
 Time: 49 days, 14 hours, 21 minutes

2005 – Woodvale Atlantic Rowing Race

 Departure Port: San Sebastián de la Gomera
 Arrival Port: English Harbour, Antigua
 Race Start: 30 November 2005
 Teams Starting: 27 
 Teams Finishing: 20 
 Categories: Singles, Pairs, Fours
 Winning Boat: 
 Team Name: C2
 Country: 
 Rowers: Clint Evans and Chris Andrews
 Time: 52 days, 2 hours, 10 minutes
For more race details, see: 2005 Woodvale Atlantic Rowing Race

2007 – Woodvale Atlantic Rowing Race 

 Departure Port: San Sebastián de la Gomera
 Arrival Port: English Harbour, Antigua
 Race Start: 2 December 2007
 Teams Starting: 22 
 Teams Finishing: 20 
 Categories: Singles, Pairs, Fours
 Winning Boat:
 Team Name: Pure Vida
 Country: 
 Rowers: John Cecil-Wright, Robbie Grant, Tom Harvey, and Carl Theakston
 Time: 48 Days, 2 hours, 52 minutes
For more race details, see: 2007 Woodvale Atlantic Rowing Race

2009/2010 – Woodvale Atlantic Rowing Race 

 Departure Port: San Sebastián de la Gomera
 Arrival Port: Antigua
 Race Start: 4 January 2010 (Race delayed by a month)
 Teams Starting: 7 Solos, 20 Pairs, 3 Fours 
 Teams Finishing: 20
 Categories: Singles, Pairs, Fours
 Winning Boat: JJ (Insure & Go)
 Team Name: Charlie Pitcher
 Country: 
 Rowers: Charlie Pitcher
 Time: 52 days 6 hours and 47 minutes

2011 – Talisker Whisky Atlantic Challenge 

 Departure Port: San Sebastián de la Gomera
 Arrival Port: Port St. Charles, Barbados
 Race Start: 5 December 2011 
 Teams Starting: 17
 Teams Finishing: 11
 Categories: Singles, Doubles, Fours, Fives, and Sixes
 Winning Boat: Box No 8
 Team Name: Box No 8
 Country: 
 Rowers: Toby Iles and Nick Moore
 Time: 40 days, 9 hours, 15 minutes

2013 – Talisker Whisky Atlantic Challenge 

 Departure Port: San Sebastián de la Gomera
 Arrival Port: Antigua
 Race Start: 4 December 2013 
 Teams Starting: 17
 Teams Finishing: 11
 Categories: Singles, Doubles, Trios, Fours, Fives
 Winning Boat: Locura
 Team Name: Team Locura
 Country: 
 Rowers: Tom Salt and Mike Burton
 Time: 40 days, 2 hours, 38 minutes, 54 seconds

2015 – Talisker Whisky Atlantic Challenge 

 Departure Port: San Sebastián de la Gomera
 Arrival Port: Antigua
 Race Start: 20 December 2015 
 Teams Starting: 26
 Teams Finishing: 26
 Categories: Singles, Doubles, Trios, Fours
 Winning Boat: Ocean Reunion
 Team Name: Ocean Reunion
 Country: 
 Rowers: Angus Collins, Gus Barton, Joe Barnett, Jack Mayhew
 Time: 37 days, 9 hours, 12 minutes

2016 – Talisker Whisky Atlantic Challenge 

 Departure Port: San Sebastián de la Gomera
 Arrival Port: Antigua
 Race Start: 14 December 2016 
 Teams Starting: 12
 Teams Finishing: 11
 Categories: Singles, Doubles, Trios, Fours
 Winning Boat: American Spirit
 Team Name: Latitude 35
 Country: Mixed ( and ) 
 Rowers: Jason Caldwell (USA), Matthew Brown (USA), Angus Collins (UK), Alex Simpson (UK)
 Time: 35 days, 14 hours, 3 minutes (New Race Record)

2017 – Talisker Whisky Atlantic Challenge 

 Departure Port: San Sebastián de la Gomera
 Arrival Port: English Harbour, Antigua
 Race Start: 14 December 2017 
 Teams Starting: 26 
 Teams Finishing: 22
 Categories: Singles, Doubles, Trios, Fours
 Winning Boat: Aegir 
 Team Name: The Four Oarsmen
 Country: 
 Rowers: George Biggar, Peter Robinson, Stuart Watts, Richard Taylor 
 Time: 29 days, 14 hours, 34 minutes (New Race Record)

2018 – Talisker Whisky Atlantic Challenge 

 Departure Port: San Sebastián de la Gomera
 Arrival Port: English Harbour, Antigua
 Race Start: 12 December 2018 
 Teams Starting: 28 
 Teams Finishing:  27
 Categories: Singles, Doubles, Trios, Fours, Fives
 Winning Boat: Rose 
 Team Name: Dutch Atlantic Four
 Country: 
 Rowers: Marcel Ates, Erik Koning, David de Bruijn, Bart Adema
 Time: 34 days, 12 hours, 9 minutes

2019 – Talisker Whisky Atlantic Challenge 

 Departure Port: San Sebastián de la Gomera
 Arrival Port: English Harbour, Antigua
 Race Start: 12 December 2019 
 Teams Starting: 35 
 Teams Finishing: 35
 Categories: Singles, Doubles, Trios, Fours, Fives
 Winning Boat: 
 Team Name: Fortitude IV 
 Country: 
 Rowers: Oliver Palmer, Tom Foley, Hugh Gilum, Max Breet 
 Time: 32 days, 12 hours, 35 minutes, 2 seconds 2019 – Talisker Whisky Atlantic Challenge

2021 – Talisker Whisky Atlantic Challenge 

 Departure Port: San Sebastián de la Gomera
 Arrival Port: English Harbour, Antigua
 Race Start: 12 December 2021 
 Teams Starting: 36 
 Teams Finishing: 35
 Categories: Singles, Doubles, Trios, Fours, Fives
 Winning Boat: 
 Team Name: SWISS RAW 
 Country: 
 Rowers: Roman Moeckli, Ingvar Groza, Samuel Widmer, Jan Hurni 
 Time: 34 days, 23 hours, 42 minutes 2021 – Talisker Whisky Atlantic Challenge

Current Race Records

Ocean rowing records for The Atlantic Rowing Race are maintained by Ocean Rowing Stats.

References

External links
 Talisker Whisky Atlantic Challenge 2015
 Ocean Rowing Stats
 Atlantic Rowing Race 2009
 Atlantic Rowing Race 2005 
 Woodvale Events 
 Association of Ocean Rowers
 Ocean Rowing Society International
 BBC report of the 2005 start
 BBC report – Champagne for Beer Rowers

 
Atlantic Ocean